Albert Constable (June 3, 1805 – September 18, 1855) was a US Democratic politician and lawyer.

Born near Charlestown, Maryland, Constable studied law and was admitted to the bar in 1829.  He was elected as a Democrat to the United States House of Representatives from Maryland and served from March 4, 1845, to March 3, 1847.  He was later judge of the circuit court of Maryland in 1851.  He died in Camden, New Jersey.

References

Maryland state court judges
United States Department of the Treasury officials
1805 births
1855 deaths
Democratic Party members of the United States House of Representatives from Maryland
19th-century American politicians
19th-century American judges